Christ of the Abyss  (Italian:  Il Cristo degli Abissi) is a submerged bronze statue of Jesus Christ by , the original cast of which is located in the Mediterranean Sea, off San Fruttuoso, between Camogli and Portofino on the Italian Riviera. Various other casts of the statue are located in other places worldwide, in underwater locations, churches and museums.

Original clay statue

The original clay positive, minus the arms, was located in a foundry in 1993. The arms were later found and attached, but not the hands, which had to be replaced. The reconfigured clay sculpture is now on display at the National Museum of Underwater Activities in Ravenna, Italy.

Three bronze statues

Italy (1954)
It was sculpted by Guido Galletti, based on an idea of Italian diving instructor . The statue was placed near the spot where Dario Gonzatti, the first Italian to use SCUBA gear, died in 1947. It depicts Christ offering a benediction of peace, with his head and hands raised skyward. The statue was subsequently dedicated to the memory of Marcante.

Due to increasing amounts of corrosion and the growth of crustaceans, the statue was removed from the water and restored in 2003. A hand that had been detached, presumably by an anchor, was also replaced. The statue was returned to the water with a new base on 17 July 2004. The statue was cleaned in 2018.

Grenada (1961)

A second bronze sculpture, cast from the same mold as the original bronze statue, was placed on the coastline of St. George's, Grenada. It was a gift of the navy of Genoa for assistance in rescuing the crew of the Italian vessel , which was destroyed by fire in the port of St. George's. The sculpture was placed on October 22, 1961.

U.S. (1962)

A third bronze statue, from the original mold, was presented to the Underwater Society of America in New York in 1962, and shipped by boat to Chicago, where it was set up for unveiling in the ballroom of the Palmer House Hotel at the Underwater Society of America 1962 convention. The statue weighs around 260 kg, and the concrete base to which it is attached weighs approximately 9 tons.

In popular culture
In Part 3 of the Netflix Original series Bloodline (Season 1, Episode 3), Danny Rayburn is seen taking guests at his family's Monroe County, Florida inn, Rayburn House, snorkeling at Christ of the Abyss in Florida.
An image of one of the statues was used as cover art, both for BT's 1995 album Ima, and for God Lives Underwater's 1995 debut album Empty.

See also
 List of statues of Jesus

References

Further reading

Sculpture Christ of the Deep

Statues of Jesus
Underwater diving sites in Italy
1954 sculptures
1961 sculptures
1962 sculptures
Underwater sculpture